Fair Grove Methodist Church Cemetery is a historic church cemetery associated with the Fair Grove Methodist Church at Thomasville, Davidson County, North Carolina. It contains approximately 400 gravestones, with the earliest gravestone dated to 1829. It features a unique collection of folk gravestones by local stonecutters erected in Davidson County in the late-18th and first half of the 19th centuries.

It was listed on the National Register of Historic Places in 1984.

Gallery

References

External links
 

Methodist cemeteries
Cemeteries on the National Register of Historic Places in North Carolina
Cemeteries in Davidson County, North Carolina
National Register of Historic Places in Davidson County, North Carolina
Thomasville, North Carolina